Thomas Lee Wilson (September 1, 1932 – December 31, 2006) was a professional American football player.

Professional career
Wilson played running back for eight seasons in the National Football League (NFL).

College career
Wilson did not play college football.

Personal life
His son Steve Wilson, played ten seasons in the NFL.

References

1932 births
2006 deaths
American football fullbacks
American football halfbacks
Los Angeles Rams players
Cleveland Browns players
Minnesota Vikings players
Western Conference Pro Bowl players
Sportspeople from Durham, North Carolina
Sportspeople from Stamford, Connecticut
Players of American football from North Carolina
African-American players of American football
20th-century African-American sportspeople
21st-century African-American people